We Have Amnesia Sometimes is the sixteenth studio album by Yo La Tengo, released on July 17, 2020.

Background
The album consists of five tracks recorded during the COVID-19 pandemic. The songs were recorded by the band placing a single mic in the center of their rehearsal space. The improvised songs are reminiscent of ambient music, with slowly moving, droning sounds. 

The digital version of the album includes recolored versions of the main cover art attached to each track.

Reception
The album has received mostly favorable reviews. On review aggregator website Metacritic, the album has a score of 79, indicating generally favorable reviews.

Track listing
All songs written by Yo La Tengo.

References

External links

2020 albums
Matador Records albums
Yo La Tengo albums